Fiona McFarlane (born 1978) is an Australian author, best known for her book The Night Guest and her collection of short stories The High Places. She is a recipient of the Voss Literary Prize, the UTS Glenda Adams Award for New Writing at the New South Wales Premier's Literary Awards, the Dylan Thomas Prize, and the Nita Kibble Literary Award.

Life and career

McFarlane was born in Sydney, Australia in 1978. She studied English at the University of Sydney, the University of Cambridge and the University of Texas at Austin.

Her debut novel, The Night Guest, was published in 2013 and is about a retired widow who lives alone and suffers from dementia. It won the Voss Literary Prize and the UTS Glenda Adams Award for New Writing at the New South Wales Premier's Literary Awards. It was also shortlisted for the Miles Franklin Award, The Stella Prize and the Guardian First Book Award.

In 2017, McFarlane won the Dylan Thomas Prize for her collection of short stories, The High Places.

McFarlane's writing has also appeared in Zoetrope: All-Story, Southerly and The New Yorker.

Bibliography

Novels

Collection of short stories

Short stories in anthologies

 "Movie People" in 
 "Exotic Animal Medicine" in 
 "I Will Tell You Something" in 
 "Good News for Modern Man" in 
 "Buttony" in

Online short stories
 Art Appreciation - published in The New Yorker on May 6, 2013
 Buttony - published in The New Yorker on February 29, 2016
 Demolition - published in The New Yorker on May 25, 2020

References

1978 births
Living people
21st-century Australian women writers
21st-century Australian writers
Writers from Sydney
Alumni of the University of Cambridge
University of Sydney alumni
Michener Center for Writers alumni
O. Henry Award winners